Mark Noel Foster Robinson (born 26 December 1946) is a former Conservative Party politician in the United Kingdom.

Early life and family

Born in Bristol to John Foster Robinson, CBE, TD, and Margaret, née Paterson, Robinson's father was High Sheriff of Avon in 1975. John Robinson's family ran ES&A Robinson, the paper and packaging conglomerate that later became Dickinson Robinson Group. Apart from paper, the Robinsons were famous for cricket: Robinson's grandfather, Sir Foster Robinson, was captain of Gloucestershire; other members of the family played for, and captained, Gloucestershire. Robinson was educated at Harrow and Christ Church, Oxford, where he read Modern History.

UN and Commonwealth

Robinson spent six years at the United Nations: at the UN Relief Operation to Bangladesh; in the Office of the Under-Secretary General; and in the Office of the Secretary General, Kurt Waldheim. From 1977 to 1983 he was assistant director in the Office of the Commonwealth Secretary-General, who was then Sir Shridath Ramphal.

He is currently: Chairman of the Commonwealth Organisations' Committee on Zimbabwe; the UK Chairman of the Commonwealth Consortium for Education; a Council Member of the Winston Churchill Memorial Trust; Hon. Treasurer of the Commonwealth Round Table: the Commonwealth Journal of International Affairs; and a Trustee of Concordia UK.

Member of Parliament

Robinson was elected Conservative Member of Parliament for the notionally safe Labour seat of Newport West in 1983. Because of his background at the UN and Commonwealth he was appointed to the Foreign Affairs Select Committee, a position he held until in 1985 when he was appointed Parliamentary Under-Secretary of State, Welsh Office, by Margaret Thatcher. Despite achieving an increase in his share of the vote, he lost his seat at the 1987 General Election to Paul Flynn. He was re-elected in 1992 for the Somerset seat of Somerton and Frome. He was Parliamentary Private Secretary to the Minister for Overseas Development, Baroness Chalker, and the Foreign and Commonwealth Secretary, Douglas Hurd, but was defeated at the 1997 General Election by David Heath. He has since served as a Commonwealth election observer.

From 1987 to 1995 he was a director of Leopold Joseph, the Merchant Bank, and from 1988 to 1992 he was a member of the board of the Commonwealth Development Corporation.

References

Times Guide to the House of Commons, Times Newspapers Limited, 1987 and 1997 editions.

1946 births
Living people
People educated at Harrow School
Alumni of Christ Church, Oxford
Presidents of the Oxford University Conservative Association
Conservative Party (UK) MPs for Welsh constituencies
Politics of Newport, Wales
UK MPs 1983–1987
UK MPs 1992–1997
Conservative Party (UK) MPs for English constituencies
Politicians from Bristol